The Scion Hako Coupe is a concept car unveiled by the automaker Scion at the 2008 New York International Auto Show. Inspired by the Scion xB and the emergence of American vintage style amongst young Tokyo trendsetters, Tokyo Design Division developed the Hako Coupe with classic American coupes in mind. This retro-style automobile is named for its square, "boxy" appearance and features wraparound glass windows. The front passenger cabin features two dash-mounted video screens, while the rear cabin contains side-mounted video screens.

References

External links
 Scion Concept News

Sources 
 Scion 

Hako Coupe
Concept cars
Sport compact cars
Hatchbacks
Retro-style automobiles